Pseudoschoenobius is a genus of moths of the family Crambidae. It contains only one species, Pseudoschoenobius opalescalis, which is found in North America, where it has been recorded from Alberta, Illinois, Indiana, New Mexico and California. The habitat consists of dry, sandy areas.

The wingspan is about 30 mm.  The forewings are ashy-grey with white scales between the veins. Adults are on wing in May and July.

References

Natural History Museum Lepidoptera genus database

Ancylolomiini
Crambidae genera